The 2012 NPF Draft is the ninth annual NPF Draft.  It was held March 7, 2012 5:00 PM CST in Memphis, TN at the Peabody Hotel for the 2012 season.  It was streamed live on the NPF's website.  The first selection was LSU's Brittany Mack, picked by the USSSA Pride.  Athletes are not allowed by the NCAA to sign professional contracts until their collegiate seasons have ended.

2012 NPF Draft
Position key: 
C = Catcher; UT = Utility infielder; INF = Infielder; 1B = First base; 2B =Second base SS = Shortstop; 3B = Third base; OF = Outfielder; RF = Right field; CF = Center field; LF = Left field;  P = Pitcher; RHP = right-handed Pitcher; LHP = left-handed Pitcher; DP =Designated player
Positions are listed as combined for those who can play multiple positions.

Round 1

Round 2

Round 3

Round 4

Round 5

Draft Notes

References 

2012 in softball
National Pro Fastpitch drafts